Zaunkönig (German for wren, literally "king of the fence") might refer to:
 G7es torpedo, German torpedo in World War II
 Braunschweig LF-1 Zaunkönig, German trainer aircraft